Michael Jamaine Rumph (born November 8, 1979) is an American retired American football free safety and cornerback. He is currently the Assistant Director of Recruiting for the University of Miami Hurricanes football team.

High school
Rumph attended Atlantic Community High School in Delray Beach, Florida. He was among the SuperPrep National Top 50 players and was a SuperPrep All-American. As a senior, he gained 519 yards rushing and receiving with five touchdowns and totaled 108 tackles and snagged six interceptions for 172 yards.

He was also a statewide track star in triple jump and long jump.

University of Miami
Rumph was a quiet but productive player during his career at the University of Miami which culminated with a national championship in his senior year. Rumph compiled 117 tackles (117 solo), 2 forced fumbles, and 6 interceptions (returning one for a touchdown) during his time at Miami. He was a second-team Big East selection his sophomore and senior years and a first-team selection his junior year.

Professional career

San Francisco 49ers
Rumph was drafted by the San Francisco 49ers in the first round of the 2002 NFL Draft, with the 27th overall selection. He was originally a cornerback, but the 49ers switched him to safety due to a combination of his strong tackling ability and poor man-to-man coverage skills. He missed large parts of the 2004 and 2005 seasons due to injuries.

Washington Redskins
On August 14, 2006, Rumph was traded to the Redskins for wide receiver Taylor Jacobs. On December 27, 2006, the Redskins waived him.

St. Louis Rams
Rumph was signed to the St. Louis Rams on March 20, 2007, but was released on August 3, 2007. He retired in July 2008.

Post-NFL Career
In 2010, Rumph became an assistant coach for the Miramar Everglades, and then, for a brief time served as coach at the Miami Carol City Senior High School. Following that, he served as head coach of the American Heritage High School's varsity football team in Plantation, Florida until 2015. Prior to his departure from AHHS, Rumph had substituted a former Miami Dolphins player and coach Jeff Dellenbach in 2013. Afterward, he accepted a job on Mark Richt's staff at the University of Miami as the cornerbacks coach.

Personal life
Rumph and his wife Veronica used to operate a puppy store. Mike and Veronica have two children, Jalen and Sienna.

References

External links
Mike Rumph profile at Sports Illustrated
Rumph Waived by Redskins

1979 births
Living people
African-American players of American football
American football cornerbacks
American football safeties
Miami Hurricanes football coaches
Miami Hurricanes football players
Sportspeople from Delray Beach, Florida
San Francisco 49ers players
Washington Redskins players
21st-century African-American sportspeople
20th-century African-American sportspeople